Biotron Limited (Biotron) is a biotechnology company based in Sydney, Australia, NSW. The company develops novel small-molecule antiviral therapeutics targeting Hepatitis C and HIV. Biotron has identified a new class of viral proteins as targets for potential intervention and is developing novel small-molecule therapeutics that target these proteins, specifically the P7 protein of Hepatitis C and Vpu protein of HIV.

BIT225 
BIT225 is Biotron's leading drug. Currently, it is in clinical development for treatment of both HIV and Hepatitis C, as well as HIV/Hepatitis C co-infected population. It is considered to be the first of a new class of oral direct-acting antiviral drug for Hepatitis C that may be used in combination with either current treatment strategies or with new classes of direct-acting antiviral drugs in development.

Biotechnology companies of Australia
Companies based in Sydney